Charlie and Lola is a British animated television series based on the popular children's picture book series of the same name by Lauren Child. It aired from 7 November 2005 to 24 April 2008. The animation uses a collage style that emulates the style of the original books.

Series overview

Episodes

Season 1 (2005)

Season 2 (2006–2007)

Special (2006)

Season 3 (2007–2008)

Special (2007)

Summer
But We Always Do It Like This
The Most Wonderfullest Picnic In The Whole Wide World

Webisode
I'm Far Too Busy Playing To Do Computers

References 

Lists of British children's television series episodes